Daniel Sallis Huston (born May 14, 1962) is an Italian-American actor, director and screenwriter. A member of the Huston family of filmmakers, he is the son of director John Huston and the half-brother of actress Anjelica Huston.

He is known for his roles in films such as Ivans Xtc (2000), for which he was nominated for an Independent Spirit Award for Best Male Lead, 21 Grams (2003), Birth (2004), The Aviator (also 2004), The Proposition (2005), The Constant Gardener (2005), Marie Antoinette (2006), Children of Men (also 2006), The Kingdom (2007), 30 Days of Night (also 2007), Robin Hood (2010), Hitchcock (2012), The Congress (2013), Big Eyes (2014) and the DC Extended Universe superhero film Wonder Woman (2017).

Huston portrayed The Axeman on the FX series American Horror Story: Coven and Massimo Dolcefino on American Horror Story: Freak Show. He played Ben "The Butcher" Diamond on Magic City (2012–13), Dan Jenkins in the first two seasons of the Paramount Network drama series Yellowstone (2018–19), and Jamie Laird on the second season of Succession (2019). His directing credits include the films Mr. North (1988), The Maddening (1995) and The Last Photograph (2017).

Early life
Huston was born May 14, 1962, in Rome, Italy. He is the son of director and actor John Huston, and British actress Zoe Sallis. At the time, Huston was in Italy directing The Bible: In the Beginning..., in which Sallis played Hagar. Through his father, he has an adoptive half brother, Pablo Huston, and is the half brother of actress Anjelica Huston, screenwriter Tony Huston, and writer Allegra Huston. He is the uncle of actor Jack Huston and grandson of Academy Award-winning actor Walter Huston. He is of Canadian, Welsh, Scots-Irish, Scottish, and Anglo-Indian descent. 

The younger Huston spent much of his early life in the United Kingdom and Ireland, and maintains British citizenship through his mother. He worked as an assistant to his father during the production of Under the Volcano (1984), and was a second unit director on The Dead (1987). Huston is a graduate of London Film School.

Career
Huston made his acting debut at the age of 12 in the George Kennedy-starring thriller film The "Human" Factor (1975).

In 1988, Huston directed Mr. North, which was an adaptation of Thornton Wilder's Theophilus North. The film was produced by his father, who died before its completion. In 1995, Huston played Bartender #2 in Leaving Las Vegas and directed the film The Maddening.

Huston was nominated for Best Male Performance at the Independent Spirit Awards in 2003 for his performance in the independent film Ivans Xtc.

Huston appeared in Martin Scorsese's The Aviator. The ensemble cast was nominated for a 2004 SAG Award. In 2006, Huston received the Golden Satellite Award for Best Supporting Actor for his performance as Sandy Woodrow in Fernando Meirelles' The Constant Gardener. Huston starred in the Australian western The Proposition.

Huston starred in Alpha Male and Oliver Parker's Fade to Black, in which he played Orson Welles. He starred in The Kreutzer Sonata, which premiered at the 2008 Edinburgh International Film Festival.

His other film credits include Birth, Silver City, Marie Antoinette, The Number 23, The Kingdom, How to Lose Friends & Alienate People, and 30 Days of Night. He portrayed Samuel Adams in the award-winning HBO miniseries John Adams and Colonel William Stryker in X-Men Origins: Wolverine, a prequel to the original trilogy of X-Men films.

Huston has been featured in Boogie Woogie, The Warrior's Way, Edge of Darkness, Clash of the Titans, Robin Hood, You Don't Know Jack, and Medallion.

Huston played gangster Ben "The Butcher" Diamond on Mitch Glazer's Magic City, for which was nominated for the Golden Globe Award for Best Supporting Actor – Series, Miniseries or Television Film in 2013. He portrayed The Axeman in the FX thriller series American Horror Story: Coven and Massimo Dolcefino in American Horror Story: Freak Show. Huston starred as General Erich Ludendorff in the 2017 film Wonder Woman and as Wade Jennings in Angel Has Fallen.

Personal life
In 1989, Huston married actress Virginia Madsen. They divorced in 1992. In 2001, he married Katie Jane Evans with whom he had a child, Stella. Huston and Evans separated in 2006. Evans died by suicide in October 2008 before the divorce was finalized.

Filmography

Film

Television

Awards and nominations

References

External links

1962 births
Living people
American film directors
American male film actors
American male television actors
American male voice actors
American people of Canadian descent
American people of English descent
American male actors of Indian descent
American people of Scotch-Irish descent
American people of Scottish descent
American people of Welsh descent
Film festival founders
Male actors from Rome
Danny
20th-century American male actors
21st-century American male actors
Alumni of the London Film School
People with acquired British citizenship